Actor is the second album by musician St. Vincent, released by 4AD on May 4, 2009, in the United Kingdom and a day later in the United States. Annie Clark was influenced by scores to films by Disney and Woody Allen. To prevent writer's block, Clark watched films without the sound and composed music for her favorite scenes. After arranging the music using GarageBand, she then wrote lyrics and added gentle vocal melodies.

Actor was promoted on the Actor Tour, with concerts in North America, Europe and Asia between February 2009 and December 2010.

Background

Reception

The album received wide critical acclaim. In the 2009 Pazz & Jop albums survey, Actor ranked twelfth, and most of the songs on it received mentions for the singles survey. Pitchfork gave the album an 8.5/10 rating and a "Best New Music" tag, praising the concept and describing the sound as "melodic and controlled, conjuring abrasive textures that nevertheless have a clean, meticulous quality that complements her immaculate arrangements." It later placed Actor number 13 on its year-end list of albums, and "Actor out of Work" ranked number 52 on its list of the year's top tracks. Pitchfork included "The Strangers" at number 492 on its list of the top tracks of the 2000s.

The A.V. Club review called the album a departure from St. Vincent's debut, noting an absence of "the coy, conventional pop winks of Marry Me; even Actors lovelier moments come tinged with down-the-rabbit-hole danger." Clark has "found her own voice—and it's one you wouldn't want reading your kids any bedtime stories."

Other reviewers, such as Entertainment Weekly and AllMusic, praised the album's contrast of melodic pop and distorted guitars with dark lyrics. PopMatters listed Actor number 26 on its list of the year's best albums.

Commercial performance
As of July 2011, Actor has sold 59,000 copies in US.

Singles
The first single released was "Actor out of Work" that April. It featured "Bicycle" as a B-side. The music video for "Actor out of Work" was premiered April 10, 2009 on Spinner. In it, Clark auditions a series of actors who begin sobbing in front of her.

The video for "Laughing with a Mouth of Blood" features Clark with comedy duo ThunderAnt as owners of a feminist bookstore.

Track listing
All tracks written and arranged by Annie Clark.

Notes
 On the album’s vinyl release, "The Sequel" is moved to the end of side A, following "Black Rainbow".

Personnel
Musicians

 Annie Clark – voice, guitar, bass, keys, etc.
 Hideaki Aomori – flute, clarinet, bass clarinet, alto, tenor and soprano saxophone
 Michael Atkinson – French horn, score consultant
 Daniel Hart – violin, sarangi
 McKenzie Smith – drums
 Alex Sopp – flute
 Paul Alexander – additional bass
 William Flynn – additional bass
 Jeff Ryan – additional drums
 Matthias Bossi – additional drums
 Aynsley Powell – additional drums

Production

 John Congleton – production, recording, mixing
 Annie Clark – production, additional recording
 Greg Calbi – mastering
 Scott Solter – additional recording
 Annabel Mehran – photography
 Lever and Beam – management

Charts

References

External links

2009 albums
4AD albums
St. Vincent (musician) albums
Albums produced by John Congleton
Baroque pop albums